The New Centurions is a 1972 American Panavision neo-noir action crime film based on the 1971 novel of the same name by policeman turned author Joseph Wambaugh.

It stars George C. Scott, Stacy Keach, Scott Wilson, Jane Alexander, Rosalind Cash, Erik Estrada, and James Sikking, and was directed by Richard Fleischer.

Plot
Three rookie cops, Roy Fehler (Stacy Keach), Gus Plebesly (Scott Wilson), and Sergio Duran (Erik Estrada), report for duty with the Los Angeles police department. Roy is married with a daughter and intends to eventually become a law student. Gus is a father of three. Serge is a native of East L.A., who never expected to end up patrolling its streets.

Each is assigned a veteran partner. Roy's is the greatly experienced Andy Kilvinski (George C. Scott), who has been on the force for nearly a quarter-century and has his own unique style of law enforcement. For example, he will drive a group of hookers, who he has supplied with liquor, around the city streets for hours, in a paddy wagon, simply to keep them off the streets for a night.

Gus rides with Whitey Duncan (Clifton James). As they answer a burglary call, at a market, Gus opens fire on a suspicious figure in a dark alley, only to discover, to his horror, that it is the owner of the store.

Roy begins to frustrate his wife, Dorothy (Jane Alexander), by becoming obsessed with police work, neglecting his family, and dropping out of law school. He likes the life on the street. But during a convenience store holdup, Roy tells a couple in a parked car to move. Because he was careless, he does not realize that they are the get-away crew for the robbers.  Without warning, the man shoots Roy with a sawed-off shotgun before escaping, leaving him gravely wounded on the sidewalk.

Gus and Serge discuss their fear of being shot. Serge temporarily partners with Andy, and together they handle a call involving a slum landlord. During this encounter, Andy becomes enraged and threatens the landlord for exploiting the "wetbacks" living in the apartment, in deplorable conditions. Roy gradually recovers and quickly encounters a shootout, but doesn't flinch.

As the rookies mark a year on the job, Andy reaches his 25th anniversary and mandatory retirement. He discusses the difficulties of police work with the younger men.

Roy is assigned to the vice squad, where the job is anything but glamorous—mostly arresting "fruits" for homosexual behavior in public parks. Dorothy has had enough, saying she does not care about him anymore. She leaves for San Francisco (where she meets a real estate agent) and takes their daughter, Becky, with her.

The young cops are delighted to get a visit, at the police station, from Andy, who has retired to Florida but misses police work. He regrets never having spent more time on his personal life. After speaking with Roy one last time, on the telephone, Andy puts his service revolver in his mouth and kills himself.

Depression gets the better of Roy, who begins to drink on the job. He answers a burglary call and the victim turns out to be Lorrie (Rosalind Cash), a nurse who helped him after he got shot. Later on patrol, a prostitute (Bea Thompkins) named "Silverpants" driving a Lincoln Continental, speeds off with Roy hanging from the car door. He barely avoids serious injury and Lorrie helps patch him up, but he draws a three-week suspension for being drunk on the job.

Roy begins seeing Lorrie socially and comes to his senses, appreciating the need for personal relationships, remembering what led Andy to end his life.

He goes on a shots fired call, which leads to a car chase, followed by a foot chase. Exhausted after booking the suspects, he is on the way to ending his shift, when he encounters a woman on the street who appeals for help with her threatening husband. Reluctantly, Roy, Gus, and Serge decide to investigate. As Roy takes the back stairs, the husband suddenly appears and, without warning, fires a single shot from a handgun. Roy dies in Gus's arms.

Cast
 George C. Scott as Andy Kilvinski
 Stacy Keach as Roy Fehler
 Jane Alexander as Dorothy Fehler
 Scott Wilson as Gus Plebesly
 Erik Estrada as Sergio Duran
 Clifton James as "Whitey"
 James Sikking as Sergeant Anders
 Rosalind Cash as Lorrie Hunt
 Burke Byrnes as Phillips
 Charles H. Gray as Bethel
 Pepe Serna as Young Mexican Man
 Ed Lauter as Galloway
 Bea Thompkins as Silverpants
 Hilly Hicks as Young Black Man Whose Store Is Robbed
 Kitten Natividad as Go-Go Dancer in Bar (uncredited)
 Anne Ramsey as Wife of Crazy Man (uncredited)

Production
The producers made the movie under a "first look" deal they had at Columbia. Stirling Silliphant wrote the original draft. When George C. Scott agreed to join the cast new scenes were needed for his character, but Sillipant was not available, so Towne was hired for two weeks at a fee of $200,000.

The movie was filmed on location in Los Angeles.

Reception
Roger Greenspun of The New York Times wrote "Richard Fleischer's The New Centurions is an intermittently exciting, sometimes preachy, sometimes ironic, occasionally successful film about the lives of some fictional patrol-car cops on the Los Angeles police force...It is an awkwardly modern movie. Modern not so much in its attitudes toward cops (which are really pretty traditional) as in its attitudes towards fate...Fleischer's direction is technically adequate and emotionally absent. He does not so much direct actors as provide a void for them to fill — and among the principals, George C. Scott is almost shamefully good at filling voids and Stacy Keach is not."

See also
 List of American films of 1972

References

External links
 
 
 
 

1972 films
1970s crime drama films
American crime drama films
Columbia Pictures films
Fictional portrayals of the Los Angeles Police Department
Films scored by Quincy Jones
Films based on American novels
Films directed by Richard Fleischer
Films set in Los Angeles
Films produced by Robert Chartoff
Films with screenplays by Stirling Silliphant
1972 drama films
1970s English-language films
1970s American films